Werunda County is one of the 141 Cadastral divisions of New South Wales. The Darling River is the north-western boundary. It includes Poopelloe Lake, and the area to the east and south-east of Wilcannia.

The name Werunda is believed to be derived from a local Aboriginal word.

Parishes within this county
A full list of parishes found within this county; their current LGA and mapping coordinates to the approximate centre of each location is as follows:

References

Counties of New South Wales